JEF United Ichihara Chiba Reserves is a defunct Japanese football club. It was the reserve team of J. League club JEF United Ichihara Chiba. Founded in 1995, the club played in the Japan Football League from 2006 until its closure in 2011. JEF Reserves was dissolved on 11 December 2011, owing to financial problems. They played their home games at Ichihara Seaside Stadium.

Club name transition
 Ichihara Sports Club (1995–2002)
 JEF United Ichihara Amateur Team (2003–2004)
 JEF United Ichihara Chiba Amateur Team (2005)
 JEF United Ichihara Chiba Club (2006)
 JEF United Ichihara Chiba Reserves (2007–2011)

Results in JFL

Players
The squad given here is made up of the players registered to the club on the date of club's final league match (JEF Reserves 3–3 V-Varen Nagasaki, 11 December 2011).

References

External links
(Japanese) Official Website

Japanese reserve team football
Football clubs in Japan
Association football clubs established in 1995
Association football clubs disestablished in 2011
JEF United Chiba
1995 establishments in Japan
2011 disestablishments in Japan
Japan Football League clubs